Pocahontas is a village in Bond County, Illinois, United States. The population was 697 at the 2020 census.

History
Pocahontas was originally known as Hickory Grove and then Amity. In 1850, the name was changed to Pocohontas (with an "o"). In 1855, the current spelling with an "a" came into place. Pocahontas was incorporated as a village in 1847. The town was named after Pocahontas Coal.

Geography

Demographics

As of the 2020 census there were 697 people, 321 households, and 207 families residing in the village. The racial makeup of the village was 94.55% White, 0.43% African American, 0.29% Asian, 0.00% Pacific Islander, and 4.73% from two or more races. Hispanic or Latino of any race were 0.86% of the population.

There were 321 households, out of which 47.66% had children under the age of 18 living with them, 52.96% were married couples living together, 7.17% had a female householder with no husband present, and 35.51% were non-families. 26.17% of all households were made up of individuals, and 11.84% had someone living alone who was 65 years of age or older. The average household size was 3.04 and the average family size was 2.48.

The village's age distribution consisted of 20.1% under the age of 18, 5.8% from 18 to 24, 26.6% from 25 to 44, 31.5% from 45 to 64, and 15.9% who were 65 years of age or older. The median age was 41.6 years. For every 100 females, there were 97.3 males. For every 100 females age 18 and over, there were 108.9 males.

The median income for a household in the village was $51,375, and the median income for a family was $62,188. Males had a median income of $44,375 versus $26,364 for females. The per capita income for the village was $23,914. About 10.6% of families and 18.1% of the population were below the poverty line, including 20.0% of those under age 18 and 2.4% of those age 65 or over.

Notable people

 Michael Slape, member of the Illinois House of Representatives from the 110th district from 1979-1985. He resided in Pocahontas during his political career.
 Gretchen Wilson, Grammy Award-winning country singer; born and raised in Pocahontas; she references the town in the song "Pocahontas Proud" from her 2004 album Here for the Party.

See also
 Greenville, Illinois
 Vandalia, Illinois

References

Villages in Bond County, Illinois
Villages in Illinois
Populated places established in 1847
1847 establishments in Illinois